Leverett Circle is an intersection in Boston, Massachusetts.  Completely rebuilt during the Big Dig, it is no longer a rotary.  It marks the confluence of Storrow Drive, Charles River Dam Road (Northern Artery), Nashua Street, Charles Street, and Martha Road.

Background
The Leverett Circle Connector Bridge also terminates here, and has a direct bypass in both directions connecting it directly with Storrow Drive.  It provides an onramp to Interstate 93 northbound and an offramp from I-93 southbound.  A direct onramp is available to Interstate 93 southbound, into the Thomas P. O'Neill Jr. Tunnel.

Massachusetts Route 3 passes from the tunnel onto Storrow Drive.  Massachusetts Route 28 passes from Charles River Dam Road onto Storrow Drive.

Science Park station of the MBTA Green Line is located at Leverett Circle.

See also 

Massachusetts Rehabilitation Hospital (original Spaulding building)
Lechmere Viaduct
Mugar Omni Theater
Museum of Science (Boston)
Nashua Street Jail
List of crossings of the Charles River

References

Transportation in Boston
Road interchanges in Massachusetts
West End, Boston